Cocorná is a town and municipality in the Colombian department of Antioquia. Part of the subregion of Eastern Antioquia.

Geography

Cocorná has an extension of 210 km², with a mountainous territory, great extensions of forest, and many important rivers.

Climate
Cocorná has a relatively cool tropical rainforest climate (Af) due to altitude. It has very heavy rainfall year round.

Economy
Tourism
Agriculture, specially of sugar and maize.

Roads 

Is 90 km away from Medellín, 1 hour and a half in car, by an excellent road. It also has roads to the Corregimiento La Piñuela, and the municipalities of San Francisco and Granada.

Tourism 

Cocorná has been since the 1980s a touristic place for many people, and since 2006, the government, believing in all the potential Cocorná has for it, has been sponsoring economical investments in the area.

New hotels, and many projects that involve new jobs, are the result of that.

Sites of interest
Rivers where people can practice fishing, or simply enjoy the natural pools formatted by the river
Water Falls there are many and very near to the municipality
Forest very well conserved
Landscape

References

Municipalities of Antioquia Department